Hamida Zakariya Esma'il was the first women judge in South Yemen, Yemen, and the Arab World.

Education and career 
Zakariya had a law degree from Cairo University and in 1970 worked at the South Yemen Ministry of Justice as a legal councilor.

In 1971, at the age of 27, Zakaria was appointed as a judge at the Court of Assizes, in Aden. Her appointment made her the first woman judge in the Arab world.

Personal life 
Zakariya was married and was a mother. She died prior to 2015.

See also 

 Ministry of Justice (Yemen)
 Legal system of Yemen
 Yemeni unification
 Women in Yemen

References 

1940s births
Yemeni judges
Cairo University alumni
People from Aden
Women judges